El Trabuco Venezolano - Vol. 1  is a vinyl LP by Venezuelan musician Alberto Naranjo, originally released in 1977 and partially reedited in two separate CD albums titled El Trabuco Venezolano 1977 - 1984 Vol. 1 and Vol. 2 released in 1995. It is the first of seven albums (two live albums) of the El Trabuco Venezolano musical project arranged and directed by Naranjo.

Track listing

Personnel
 Alberto Naranjo - drums, arranger, director on all tracks;timbales on 4 through 8, Dominican tambora on 4
 Eduardo Cabrera - piano on 1, 2, 4
 Lucio Caminiti - piano on 3, 7
 José Ortiz - piano on 5, 6, 8
 José Velásquez - bass guitar on all tracks
 Frank Hernández - timbales on 1, 2
 Carlos Quintero - congas on all tracks
 Jesús Quintero - bongos on all tracks
 Felipe Rengifo - percussion on 8
 Luis Arias - trumpet (lead) on all tracks
 Pablo Armitano - trumpet on all tracks except on 3 and 7
 José Díaz F. - flugel horn on 3, trumpet on 4
 Rafael Velázquez - trumpet on all tracks except on 3
 Luis Lewis Vargas - flugel horn on all tracks
 José Araujo - flugel horn on 3
 Rafael Silva - trombone (lead) on all tracks
 Rodrigo Barboza - trombone on all tracks
 Leopoldo Escalante - trombone on all tracks except on 3
 Carlos Espinoza - trombone on 3
 Carlos Daniel Palacios - lead singer on 1, 3 and chorus
 Joe Ruiz - lead singer on 3, 5, 7 and chorus
 Carlín Rodríguez - lead singer on 2, 4 and chorus
 Ricardo Quintero - lead singer on 8 and chorus

Technical personnel 
 Artistic director: Domingo Alvarez
 Associate producer: César Miguel Rondón
 Executive producer: Orlando Montiel
 Musical director: Alberto Naranjo
 Design: Víctor Viano
 Photos: Fernando Sánchez
 Label: BASF Venezuela in association with YVLP con MusiC.A.BSF-LP Stereo 50.681 / YVLP-Stereo 10.084
 Print: Editorial El Arte
 Place of Recording: Estudios Sono Dos Mil
 Recording engineer: Ricardo Landaeta
 Mastering: Antonio González - Grabaciones Antor S. A.
 Produced in Caracas, Venezuela - 1977

External links
Anapapaya.com
Salsa2u.com
Venciclopedia.com - El Trabuco Venezolano Vol. I

1977 albums
Alberto Naranjo albums